Paolo Faraboschi from Hewlett-Packard, Barcelona, Spain was named Fellow of the Institute of Electrical and Electronics Engineers (IEEE) in 2014 for contributions to embedded processor architecture and system-on-chip technology.

References

External links
HP Bio

Fellow Members of the IEEE
Living people
Year of birth missing (living people)
Place of birth missing (living people)
Hewlett-Packard people